Jan Schleiss (born September 1, 1994) is a Czech professional ice hockey player. He is currently playing for HC Plzeň of the Czech Extraliga.

Schleiss made his Czech Extraliga debut playing with HC Plzeň during the 2012-13 Czech Extraliga season.

References

External links

1994 births
Living people
HC Plzeň players
Czech ice hockey forwards
Sportspeople from Plzeň
HC Vítkovice players